The 2019–20 Invitation Limited Over Tournament was a List A cricket competition that took place in Sri Lanka. It ran from 14 to 31 December 2019, with twenty-five teams taking part. It was the first edition of the Invitation Limited Over Tournament, replacing the Premier Limited Overs Tournament, after Sri Lanka Cricket failed to approve the latter due to delays in their domestic cricket structure. Sinhalese Sports Club won the last edition of the Premier Limited Overs Tournament.

On 19 December 2019, Sandun Weerakkody scored the fastest List A century by a Sri Lankan batsman, scoring 101 not out from 39 balls for Sinhalese Sports Club against Burgher Recreation Club. The following day, only one of the twelve scheduled matches reached a result, with the other eleven fixtures all abandoned due to rain.

Ahead of the final day of fixtures, Sinhalese Sports Club, Sri Lanka Army Sports Club, Nondescripts Cricket Club, Panadura Sports Club, Saracens Sports Club, Sri Lanka Air Force Sports Club and Tamil Union Cricket and Athletic Club had all qualified for the quarterfinals. Following the conclusion of the final day of group matches, Chilaw Marians Cricket Club had also reached the quarterfinals of the tournament. Sinhalese Sports Club, Chilaw Marians Cricket Club, Nondescripts Cricket Club and Sri Lanka Army Sports Club all won their quarterfinal matches to progress in the competition.

Chilaw Marians Cricket Club and Nondescripts Cricket Club won their respective semi-final matches to advance to the final of the tournament. Chilaw Marians Cricket Club beat Nondescripts in the final by 91 runs to win the tournament.

Group stage

Group A

Group B

Group C

Group D

Quarterfinals

Finals

References

External links
 Series home at ESPN Cricinfo

Invitation Limited Over Tournament
Invitation Limited Over Tournament